Antoni Gramatyka (1841 in Kalwaria Zebrzydowska – December 23, 1922 in Kraków) was a Polish painter, associated Kraków and its surroundings.

Biography
Antoni Gramatyka began his studies at the Kraków Jan Matejko Academy of Fine Arts in 1870, where he was taught by Władysław Łuszczkiewicz and Jan Matejko. After their completion, he continued to study at the Academy of Fine Arts in Vienna, under Christian Ruben and Joseph von Führich. After returning from Vienna, Gramatyka continued his studies at the Jan Metjko Academy of Fine Arts in Kraków. Together with the Kraków Society of Friends of Fine Arts, he exhibited his works in Kraków and Lwów. As a Realist, he presented day-to-day life of the locals in Kraków and surrounding villages. He painted landscape paintings of Kalwaria Zebrzydowska, Żywiecczyzna, Podhale, Spisz and the areas surrounding Kraków. Apart from landscapes, Gramatyka also painted portraits and church polychromes, inter alia in the Płock Cathedral. He worked on renovation and conservation projects, inter alia in Queen Sophia's Chapel on the Wawel and St. Mary's Basilica in Kraków.

Gallery

References

1841 births
1922 deaths
19th-century Polish painters
19th-century Polish male artists
20th-century Polish painters
20th-century Polish male artists
Polish male painters